Saint-Stanislas-de-Kostka is a municipality of Quebec, Canada, located within the Beauharnois-Salaberry Regional County Municipality in the Montérégie administrative region. The population as of the Canada 2021 Census was 1,852.

Geography

Communities
The following locations reside within the municipality's boundaries:
Baie-des-Brises – a hamlet situated on Baie des Brises to the northwest.
Hungry Bay – a hamlet situated on Baie Hungry to the northeast.

Lakes & Rivers
The following waterways pass through or are situated within the municipality's boundaries:
Baie des Brises – a bay located on the Saint Lawrence River.
Baie Hungry – a bay located on the Saint Lawrence River.

Demographics

Population

Language

See also
 Beauharnois-Salaberry Regional County Municipality
 Beauharnois Canal
 Saint-Louis River (Beauharnois)
 List of municipalities in Quebec

References

External links
 

Incorporated places in Beauharnois-Salaberry Regional County Municipality
Quebec populated places on the Saint Lawrence River
Municipalities in Quebec